Designability Charity Limited (formerly known as the Bath Institute of Medical Engineering) is a charity and limited company working in the field of user centred design and medical engineering. Its main focus is the research and design of products that meet an unmet need for disabled people and those living with a long-term health condition.

History 
Designability (formerly known as the Bath Institute of Medical Engineering) was established in 1968 as an independent charity by an inventor and engineer, Bevan Horstmann, and local consultant surgeon, Kenneth Lloyd-Williams. BIME was first situated at St Martin's Hospital in Bath  but in 1987 it was moved to the Royal United Hospital (RUH) in Bath.

Achievements 
During the last 50 years, Designability has completed 300 projects in various disciplines.

In 1970, Designability created the world's first spring assisted armchair.

In 1990  the original Designability Junior Buggy was developed for young children with limited mobility which led to the  creation  of the current Wizzybug. The Wizzybug is a powered wheelchair designed for specifically children aged from 14 months and 5 years and aims to support development, independence and socialisation of preschool disabled children.

Designability is active in applying technology to the needs of people with dementia. Designability was the first to design a simple clock, which is helping to dispel confusion for people living with dementia.

Designability is also an active participant in a range of research projects including "Robotics in Care Chiron Project" (www.chiron.org), Nutrition in aging, task promoting for dementia and autonomous vehicles for the elderly.

Funding 
Designability are funded by 3 income streams, Charitable donations, Research grants and Commercial income from sale of products.

See also 
University of Bath
Royal United Hospital

References 

1968 establishments in England
Charities based in Somerset
Charities for disabled people based in England